The Spring Mountains National Recreation Area (SMNRA) is a U.S. national recreation area, administered by the U.S. Forest Service, west of Las Vegas, Nevada. The SMNRA is a part of the Humboldt-Toiyabe National Forest. It adjoins the Red Rock Canyon National Conservation Area, which is administered by the Bureau of Land Management.

Spring Mountains National Recreation Area is home to several plant and animal species that are threatened.  This was the driving force to create the Mount Charleston Wilderness area.

The SMNRA offers activities such as hiking, picnicking, and skiing at the Las Vegas Ski and Snowboard Resort.

History
The area was first named the Charleston Forest Reserve in 1906.

Additional land was added in 1989 to bring the area up to the current 316,000+ acres (1,279 km2).
The area was designated as Spring Mountains National Recreation Area by the U.S. Congress in 1993.

Activities

Mountain Biking 

 Bristlecone Trail
 Lower Bristlecone Trailhead
 Sawmill Trailhead
 Upper Bristlecone Trailhead

Campgrounds 

 Fletcher View Campground
 Hilltop Campground
 Kyle Canyon Road
 McWilliams Campground 
 Mt. Charleston Scenic Byway

Backpacking 

 Kyle Canyon Road
 Mt. Charleston National Recreation Trail (S. Loop)
 Mt. Charleston Scenic Byway
 North Loop Trail

Hiking 

 Bonanza Trail
 Cathedral Rock Connector Trail
 Cathedral Rock Trail
 Cathedral Rock Trailhead
 Echo Trailhead
 Fletcher Canyon Trail
 Fletcher Canyon Trailhead
 Griffith Peak Trail
 Griffith Peak Trailhead
 Kyle Canyon Road
 Lower Bristlecone Trailhead
 Mary Jane Falls Trail
 Mary Jane Trailhead
 Mt. Charleston National Recreation Trail (S. Loop)
 Mt. Charleston Scenic Byway
 North Loop Trail
 North Loop Trailhead
 Robbers Roost Trailhead
 Sawmill Loop Trail
 Sawmill Ridge Route Trail
 Sawmill Trailhead
 Trail Canyon Trail
 Trail Canyon Trailhead
 Upper Bristlecone Trail
 Upper Bristlecone Trailhead

Picnicking 

 Cathedral Rock Picnic Site
 Deer Creek Picnic Site
 Kyle Canyon Picnic Area
 Kyle Canyon Road
 Mt. Charleston Scenic Byway
 Old Mill Picnic Site
 Sawmill Trailhead

Areas for Group Picnicking at Spring Mountains National Recreation Area Office

 Foxtail Group Picnic Site
 Kyle Canyon Picnic Area

Winter Sports 

 Lee Canyon (Ski and Snowboard Resort)
 Mt. Charleston Scenic Byway

Gallery

References

External links
 U.S. Forest Service SMNRA Page
  link to SummitPost description of Cathedral Rock hiking trail 

Spring Mountains
Humboldt–Toiyabe National Forest
Protected areas of Clark County, Nevada
Protected areas of Nye County, Nevada
National Recreation Areas of the United States
Protected areas of Nevada
Protected areas of the Great Basin
Protected areas of the Mojave Desert
Protected areas established in 1993
1993 establishments in Nevada